Colmesneil is a city in Tyler County, Texas, United States. It is located 9 miles north of Woodville on U.S. Highway 69. The population was 542 at the 2020 census.

Geography

Colmesneil is located at  (30.908331, –94.423522).

According to the United States Census Bureau, the city has a total area of 2.0 square miles (5.2 km), all of it land.

Historical development
The town's name came from one of the first conductors, W. T. Colmesneil, on the Texas and New Orleans Railroad, which ran through the county. The Trinity and Sabine Railroad extended a 66-mile line from Colmesneil to Trinity, establishing the town as the shipping focal point for the county from 1881. Timber and cattle were the foremost commodities to sell due to the steep slope of the terrain. From the 1880s, the Yellow Pine Lumber Company operated a mill there, and for a while, Colmesneil's population was greater than that of Beaumont.

Demographics

As of the 2020 United States census, there were 542 people, 288 households, and 210 families residing in the city.

As of the census of 2019,  626 people, 224 households, and 133 families resided in the city. The population density was 298 people per square mile (114.6/km). The racial makeup of the city was 90.10% White, 7.55% African American, 1.17% from other races, and 1.10% from two or more races. Hispanics or Latinos of any race were 3.36% of the population.

Of the 224 households, 50.0% had children under the age of 18 living with them, 56.25% were married couples living together, 12.5% had a female householder with no husband present, and 27.7% were not families. About 23.7% of all households were made up of individuals, and 28.9% had someone who was 65 years of age or older. The average household size was 2.66 and the average family size was 3.13.

In the city, the population was distributed as 24.7% under the age of 18, 5.2% from 18 to 24, 28.2% from 25 to 44, 29.0% from 45 to 64, and 5.2% who were 65 years of age or older. The median age was 39.1 years. For every 100 females, there were 88.0 males. For every 100 females age 18 and over, there were 84.7 males.

The median income for a household in the city was $28,516 and for a family was $31,912. Males had a median income of $33,068 versus $24,464 for females. The per capita income for the city was $15,336. About 25.7% of the population was below the poverty line, including 26.8% of those under age 18 and 13.6% of those age 65 or over.

Education
The City of Colmesneil is served by the Colmesneil Independent School District.

Climate
The climate in this area is characterized by hot, humid summers and generally mild to cool winters.  According to the Köppen climate classification, Colmesneil has a humid subtropical climate, Cfa on climate maps.

References

Cities in Texas
Cities in Tyler County, Texas
Logging communities in the United States